The  is a Japanese concealed weapon.
A suntetsu is a metal rod/spike about 15 cm in length with a ring attached to it. The middle finger is inserted into the ring and the suntetsu rests in the hand by various grips. Suntetsu are small, easy to conceal and relatively simple to learn how to use. Suntetsu are used for stabbing, poking, pinching, striking, smashing, scraping and throwing. Suntetsu can be used alone or as a pair.

See also
 Emeici - a similar Chinese weapon.
 Shobo - a similar Japanese weapon.

Weapons of Japan